Saint-Jean de Montmartre is a Roman Catholic parish church located at 19 Rue des Abbesses in the 18th arrondissement of Paris.

Situated at the foot of Montmartre, it is notable as the first example of reinforced concrete in church construction. Built from 1894 through 1904, it was designed by architect Anatole de Baudot, a student of Viollet-le-Duc and Henri Labrouste. The brick and ceramic tile-faced structure exhibits features of Art Nouveau design while exploiting the superior structural qualities of reinforced concrete with lightness and transparency. The Art Nouveau stained glass was executed by Jac Galland according to the design of Pascal Blanchard. Interior sculpture was by Pierre Roche.

The reinforced concrete structure followed a system developed by the engineer Paul Cottancin.
Construction was attended by skepticism over the properties of the new material, which violated rules laid down for unreinforced masonry construction. A lawsuit delayed construction, resulting in a demolition order that was not resolved until 1902, when construction was resumed.

There is a guided tour of the church on every fourth Sunday of the month at 4:00 PM.

Commission and Construction

Commission 
The Church of Saint-Jean-Montmartre was commissioned by Montmartre priest Father Sobbeaux. The population of the town was growing and the only other abbey church, Saint-Pierre de Montmartre was too small. Saint-Pierre de Montmartre was located at the top hill of Montmartre, and could only serve those living up there. The new church was part of Fr. Sobbeaux's personal mission to evangelize the population of the lower part of the hill, and he was responsible for raising all the funds for construction.

Construction 
Architect Anatole De Baudot was chosen to build the new church. Together he and engineer Paul Cottancin worked together to develop a new construction technique that would be strong, lightweight, and inexpensive to produce. Using reinforced concrete in his design allowed to Baudot to underbid his competitors and win the contract to build the church. Part of the decision to use reinforced concrete was the topography of the site where it was to be built, steeply sloping landscape on the side of the hill of Montmartre.

The reinforced concrete system used in Saint-Jean-de- Montmartre was perfected by Paul Cottancin in 1890. This system was known as ciment armé, in the book Studies in Tectonic Culture, Kenneth Frampton explains the system, "Cottancin's ciment armé employed wire-reinforced, perforated brickwork as the permanent framework of a cement armature, together with thin, lightweight cement shells... the wire reinforcement and cement infill were considered as acting independently, the former in tension the latter in compression." Other reinforced concrete patents at this time suffered fundamental weaknesses form the relationship between the concrete and metal reinforcement, the separation in Cottancin's system allowed him to avoid this, and gave him an advantage over all other reinforced concrete systems until the turn of the century.

The strength provided by the reinforced concrete allowed the church to have ribbed vaults. Previously, the heavy stone vaults had to be accompanied by thick walls that could handle the weight and thrust of the vault. New developments in building materials and construction techniques allowed walls to become thinner while still supporting vaulted ceilings.

Delays 
Using reinforced concrete on Saint-Jean-de-Montmartre resulted in the church being quite ahead of its time, and building codes had not caught up yet. Cottancin's system was so new and revolutionary, it was difficult for people to believe the structure would actually stand. Even other architects opposed the plan, and believed it would collapse. The church was built in ten years, the reason for it taking so long was because construction had to be stopped as a result of a lawsuit filed in 1898 due to " non-conformity of town planning". Next came an order for the demolition of the building. This resulted in the performance of innumerable tests to ensure the structural integrity of the building. To save the church, Baudot and Sobbeaux set up technical demonstrations. They recreated the pillars and flagstone floor in the garden of the church to prove the strength and stability of the building. This demonstration reassured the skeptics and the order for the destruction of the church was lifted.

Style 
Saint-Jean-de-Montmartre is the first religious building to be made from concrete, understandably there was some concern over the aesthetic qualities of the material. The red brick facade, is used for decoration as well as additional support an insulation. The exterior is also embellished with geometric designs made from multicolored sandstone pearls. Saint-Jean-de-Montmartre is in the architectural style art nouveau, one of the few Parisian churches in this style. The theme of the exterior and interior design is based on the writings of St. John- The fourth Gospel and the Apocalypse.

Organ 
The organ of Saint-Jean-de-Montmartre was built by Cavaillé-Coll in 1852 for the École Sacré-Cœur de la Ferrandière in Lyon. It was moved and rebuilt in its new home in 1910 and enlarged in 1921, 1931 and 1934 by Gutschenritter. It was renovated in 1979 by Jacques Barbéris. The organ's condition started to deteriorate in 1986 and became practically unplayable by 2009. The City of Paris appointed the organbuilder Yves Fossaert http://orgues-fossaert.com/ to restore the instrument. This project, entirely financed by the City of Paris, began in 2009 and lasted fourteen months.

References

External links 

Photo Gallery
To obtain the stoplist for this organ, as well as for all the organs of Paris
Parish website

Roman Catholic churches in the 18th arrondissement of Paris
Roman Catholic churches completed in 1904
Art Nouveau architecture in Paris
Art Nouveau church buildings in France
Montmartre
20th-century Roman Catholic church buildings in France